= International School for Business and Social Studies =

- Mednarodna fakulteta za družbene in poslovne študije
- Location: Celje, Slovenia
- Website: mfdps.si/enm

International School for Business and Social Studies (ISSBS, Slovene: Mednarodna fakulteta za družbene in poslovne študije) is a faculty located in Celje, Slovenia. The faculty offers both undergraduate and post-graduate courses.

== Courses ==
Some of the courses offered by the faculty are:

- Economics in Contemporary Society
- Business in Contemporary Society
- Knowledge Management
- Management and Quality in Education
- Human Resource Management
